Kandannagar is a small colony in Tiruchirappalli district,  Tamil Nadu,  India. It is located in Srirangam taluk.

Tiruchirappalli district